Favoritos (Spanish and Portuguese for favorites) is the Sony PlayStation budget range in South America, currently offering PlayStation 3 games at a lower price point than initial release. Similar budget ranges from Sony include the Greatest Hits and The Best labels for the North American and Asian markets, respectively.

The range was first announced at E3 2013, with the initial selection of games including Gran Turismo 5, Heavy Rain and Twisted Metal, among others.

PlayStation 3 titles

The Favoritos line includes the following titles

 Assassin's Creed: Revelations
 Bayonetta
 BioShock
 Borderlands
 Call of Duty 4: Modern Warfare
 CounterSpy
 Castlevania: Lords of Shadow
 Darksiders
 Darksiders II
 Dead Nation
 Deadly Premonition
 Dead or Alive 5 Ultimate
 Demon’s Souls
 Devil May Cry HD Collection
 DmC: Devil May Cry
 DuckTales: Remastered
 Everybody Dance
 EyePet & Friends
 Fallout: New Vegas
 Final Fantasy XIII
 God of War Collection
 God of War: Origins Collection
 God of War 3
 God of War: Ascension
 Gran Turismo 5 XL Edition
 Heavy Rain: Director's Cut
 Hohokum
 InFAMOUS 2
 Jak and Daxter Collection
 Journey Collector's Edition
 Just Dance 3
 Killzone 2
 Killzone 3
 L.A. Noire

 LittleBigPlanet 2 Special Edition
 Max Payne 3
 Metal Gear Solid HD Collection
 Metal Gear Solid 4: Guns of the Patriots
 ModNation Racers
 MotorStorm: Apocalypse
 Ninja Gaiden 3
 Rain
 PlayStation All-Stars Battle Royale
 Ratchet & Clank:  All 4 One
 Rayman Origins
 Red Dead Redemption
 Red Dead Redemption: Undead Nightmare
 Resident Evil 5: Gold Edition
 Resistance 3
 Saints Row: The Third
 Sound Shapes
 Spec Ops: The Line
 The Tomb Raider Trilogy
 Transformers: Fall of Cybertron
 Twisted Metal
 Silent Hill HD Collection
 Sonic Generations
 Super Street Fighter IV: Arcade Edition
 The Amazing Spider-Man
 The Ico & Shadow of the Colossus Collection
 The King of Fighters XIII
 The Walking Dead – Game of the Year
 Uncharted: Drake's Fortune
 Uncharted 2: Among Thieves
 Uncharted 3: Drake's Deception
 Valkyria Chronicles
 Vanquish
 Zone of the Enders HD Collection

See also
Greatest Hits, the North American budget range.
The Best, the Japanese budget range.
Nintendo Selects, a similar marketing label used by Nintendo.

References

Budget ranges
PlayStation (brand)